Alan Hansen's Sports Challenge is a sports based quiz video game for Wii, PlayStation 2 and Microsoft Windows platforms developed by The Code Monkeys and published by Oxygen Games. It is based on former Liverpool and Scotland footballer Alan Hansen. It was released in Europe in November 2007.

References

External links
 Oxygen Interactive website

2007 video games
Europe-exclusive video games
Windows games
PlayStation 2 games
Quiz video games
Wii games
Multiplayer and single-player video games
Video games developed in the United Kingdom
Oxygen Games games